Mohamed Bouhalla (born 25 July 1963) is an Algerian racewalker. He competed in the men's 20 kilometres walk at the 1988 Summer Olympics.

References

1963 births
Living people
Athletes (track and field) at the 1988 Summer Olympics
Algerian male racewalkers
Olympic athletes of Algeria
21st-century Algerian people